Trading Favors is a 1997 American film directed by Sondra Locke starring Rosanna Arquette.

Plot
Lincoln Muller's life turns upside down when he asks an attractive woman to buy him a beer at a convenience store. Then he learns that both she and her abusive boyfriend are into crime and violence, and Lincoln has been sucked in whether he likes it or not.

Cast
 Rosanna Arquette as Alex Langley
 George Dzundza as Wallace Muller
 Devon Gummersall as Lincoln Muller
 Julie Ariola as Judy Muller
 Frances Fisher as Librarian
 Jason Hervey as Andy
 Craig Nigh as Bobby
 Duke Valenti as Biker
 Chad Lowe as Marty
 Saachiko as Rosie
 Rolando Molina as Hector
 Marty McSorley as The Bouncer
 Paul Herman as The Bartender
 Alanna Ubach as Christy
 Richard Riehle as Highway Patrolman
 Peter Greene as Teddy

Production
The original script title was Do Me a Favor.

References

External links

Do Me a Favor at FilmAffinity
Do Me a Favor at LetterBox D

1997 films
1997 crime drama films
American crime drama films
Films directed by Sondra Locke
Films produced by Andrew Form
Films scored by Jeff Rona
1990s English-language films
1990s American films